General Oakes may refer to:

Hildebrand Oakes (1754–1822), British Army lieutenant general
John Cogswell Oakes (1906–1982), U.S. Army lieutenant general
Robert C. Oaks (born 1936), U.S. Air Force general